Divriği, historically Tephrike  (Greek: Τεφρική), is a small town and district of Sivas Province of Turkey. The town lies on gentle slope on the south bank of the Çaltısuyu river, a tributary of the Karasu river. The Great Mosque and Hospital of Divriği, along with the adjoining hospital (Darüşşifa), are on UNESCO's World Heritage List by virtue of the exquisite carvings and architecture of both buildings. Hakan Gök is the current mayor.

History

Middle Ages

Tephrike was recaptured by the Byzantine Empire during the reign of Emperor Basil I and was temporarily named Leontokome (after Emperor Leo VI) and made into a thema. It had been founded ca. 850 by Karbeas, the leader of the Paulicians, a heretical Armenian sect that adhered to a dualistic cosmology.  The Paulicians fortified it and used it as refuge and the capital of their state during the ninth century.  In the early eleventh century, the town was part of the territory given to the Armenian king Seneqerim-Hovhannes of Vaspurakan in exchange for his lands in Vaspurakan.

After the battle of Manzikert (present day Malazgirt), Divriği came under the control of the Sultanate of Rûm. A medieval castle, with remains mostly from the thirteenth century, is situated on top of a steep hill overlooking the town.

Demographics
About 103 of the 109 villages are populated by Alevis. The majority of the Alevi population is Turkish, with a significant Kurdish Alevi minority. Evliya Çelebi included that Divriği was made up of Greeks and Turkomans as well as Armenians and Kurds in his seyahatname.

Notable people 
Müslüm Doğan
Nuri Demirağ

See also
 Divriği Great Mosque
 Mengujekids

References

Sources

 (Book cover)

External links

Divriği Great Mosque And Hospital
 
 
 
 

Sivas
Cities in Turkey
Populated places in Sivas Province
Paulicianism
 
850s establishments